"Valentine" is a single by English recording artist Jessie Ware and English keyboardist and singer, Sampha.

The single was released as a digital download and as a limited edition 12" heart-shaped vinyl on 14 February 2011.

Music video
The music video for "Valentine" was directed by Marcus Söderlund.

Track listing

References

External links
 Jessie Ware & Sampha - Valentine (Music Video on YouTube)

2010 songs
2011 singles
Jessie Ware songs
Sampha songs
Songs written by Sampha
Songs written by Jessie Ware
Young Turks (record label) singles